Nostalgia, styled (nostalgia), is a 1971 American experimental film by artist Hollis Frampton. It is part of his Hapax Legomena series.

Summary
The film is composed of black-and-white still photographs taken by Frampton during his early artistic explorations which are slowly burned on the element of a hot plate, while the soundtrack offers personal comments on the content of the images, read by fellow artist Michael Snow. Each comment/story is heard in succession before the related photograph appears onscreen, thus causing the viewer to actively engage with the 'past' and 'present' moments as presented within the film.

Legacy
In 2003, Nostalgia was selected for preservation in the United States National Film Registry by the Library of Congress as being "culturally, historically, or aesthetically significant".
The Librarian of Congress, James H. Billington described it (along with Film Portrait by Jerome Hill) as "avant-garde classics considered eloquent and evocative explorations of memory and family". The film is part of Anthology Film Archives' Essential Cinema Repertory collection.

It is available on the DVD collection Treasures IV: American Avant-Garde Film, 1947-1986 (2008), as well as in a Hollis Frampton box set from the Criterion Collection A Hollis Frampton Odyssey (2012).

See also
 List of American films of 1971
 Nostalgia
 Still image film

References

External links
(nostalgia) essay  on the National Film Registry website

Official site of Hollis Frampton

(nostalgia) essay by Daniel Eagan in America's Film Legacy: The Authoritative Guide to the Landmark Movies in the National Film Registry, A&C Black, 2010 , pages 679-681

1971 films
1970s avant-garde and experimental films
American avant-garde and experimental films
United States National Film Registry films
Films directed by Hollis Frampton
Films about memory
1970s English-language films
1970s American films